The 1988 President's Cup International Football Tournament was the 17th competition of Korea Cup. This edition was held from 16 to 28 June 1988 to prepare the 1988 Summer Olympics, which was hosted in their country, and was the largest scale among all-time Korea Cups. Czechoslovakia XI won the tournament after defeating Soviet Union XI in the final.

Group stage

Group A

Group B

Group C

Group D

Knockout stage

Bracket

Quarter-finals

Semi-finals

Third place play-off

Final

Goalscorers

See also
Korea Cup
South Korea national football team results

References

External links
President's Cup 1988 (South Korea) at RSSSF

1988
1988 in South Korean sport